A list of trade unions in France:

Unions 
Five confederations recognized by the state as representative trade union:
Confédération Française Démocratique du Travail (CFDT)
Confédération Française des Travailleurs Chrétiens (CFTC)
Confédération générale du travail (CGT)
Confédération Française de l'Encadrement - Confédération Générale des Cadres (CFE-CGC)
Confédération générale du travail - Force Ouvrière (FO)

Other large unions:
 Union nationale des syndicats autonomes (UNSA)
 Solidaire

Regional Unions:
 Confédération générale du travail - Martinique (CGTM) in Martinique
 Confédération générale du travail de Guadeloupe (CGTM) in Guadeloupe
 Corsican Workers' Trade Union (STC) in Corsica
 Syndicat des Travailleurs de Bretagne (STB) in Brittany
 Langile Abertzaleen Batzordeak (LAB) in Basque country
 Union syndicale des travailleurs kanaks et des exploités (USTKE) in New Caledonia

Small unions:
 Confédération nationale du travail-Vignole (CNT-F)
 Confédération nationale du travail-AIT (CNT-AIT)
 Confédération nationale du travail-Solidarité Ouvrière (CNT-SO)
 Confédération autonome du travail (CAT)

Sectorial Union:
 Fédération Syndicale Unitaire (FSU)
 Fédération générale autonome des fonctionnaires (FGAF)
 Alliance Police nationale
 Syndicat de la Magistrature (SM)
 Union syndicale des magistrats (USM)
 Syndicat du travail sexuel (STRASS)
 Fédération autonome de la fonction publique territoriale (FA-FPT)
 Syndicat national des journalistes (SNJ)
 Syndicat des Travailleurs et Travailleuses du Jeu Vidéo (STJV)

Historic unions:
 Confédération Générale du Travail Unitaire (CGT-U) a scission from the CGT from 1921 to 1936 when it fused back in the CGT
 Confédération Générale du Travail-Syndicaliste Révolutionnaire (CGT-SR) an anarchist scission from the CGT-U present from 1926 to 1939, refounded in the CNT
 Fédération nationale des Jaunes de France a company union present from 1902 to 1912

See also

 List of trade unions

List of trade unions in the United Kingdom
List of trade unions in the United States
List of trade unions in Germany

References

France
Trade unions